The House of Vasa or Wasa was an early modern royal house founded in 1523 in Sweden. Its members ruled the Kingdom of Sweden from 1523 to 1654 and the Polish–Lithuanian Commonwealth from 1587 to 1668. Its agnatic line became extinct with the death of King John II Casimir of Poland in 1672.

The House of Vasa descended from a Swedish 14th-century noble family, tracing agnatic kinship to Nils Kettilsson (Vasa) (died 1378), fogde of Tre Kronor Castle in Stockholm. Several members held high offices during the 15th century. In 1523,  after the abolition of the Kalmar Union, Gustav Eriksson (Vasa) became King Gustav I of Sweden and the royal house was founded. His reign is sometimes referred to as the beginning of the modern state of Sweden, which included the King's break with the Roman Catholic Church during the Protestant Reformation and the foundation of the Church of Sweden.

However, his eldest son and successor Erik XIV of Sweden was overthrown by Gustav's younger son, King John III of Sweden. John III married a Catholic Polish princess, Catherine Jagiellon, leading to the House of Vasa becoming rulers of Poland.

Their Catholic son Sigismund III Vasa, then ruler of a short-lived Polish–Swedish union, was usurped in 1599 by John's Protestant brother King Charles IX of Sweden in the War against Sigismund. The dynasty was then split into a Protestant Swedish branch and a Catholic Polish one, which contended for crowns in subsequent wars.

The involvement of the famous Protestant general and King Gustavus Adolphus of Sweden in the Thirty Years' War gave rise to the saying that he was the incarnation of "the Lion of the North" (German: "Der Löwe von Mitternacht"). Yet, notably, his daughter and heiress Queen Christina of Sweden (1632–1654) abdicated in 1654 after converting to Catholicism, and emigrated to Rome. In Poland, John II Casimir of Poland abdicated in 1668. With his death, the royal House of Vasa became extinct in 1672, though the current King of Sweden, Carl XVI Gustaf, is descended from Gustav I through his paternal great-grandmother, Victoria of Baden, a descendant of Gustav I's great-great-grandson Adolphus Frederick II, Duke of Mecklenburg-Strelitz.

Kingdom of Sweden

Gustav I of Sweden 
Gustav Eriksson, a son of Cecilia Månsdotter Eka and Erik Johansson Vasa, was probably born in 1496. The birth most likely took place in Rydboholm Castle, northeast of Stockholm, the manor house of the father, Erik. The newborn got his name, Gustav, from Erik's grandfather Gustav Anundsson.
Since the end of the 14th century, Sweden had been a part of the Kalmar Union with Denmark and Norway. The Danish dominance in this union occasionally led to uprisings in Sweden. During Gustav's childhood, parts of the Swedish nobility tried to make Sweden independent. Gustav and his father Erik supported the party of Sten Sture the Younger, regent of Sweden from 1512, and its struggle against the Danish King Christian II. Following the battle of Brännkyrka in 1518, where Sten Sture's troops beat the Danish forces, it was decided that Sten Sture and King Christian would meet in Österhaninge for negotiations. To guarantee the safety of the king, the Swedish side sent six hostages to be kept by the Danes for as long as the negotiations lasted. However, Christian did not show up for the negotiations, violated the deal with the Swedish side, and took the hostages to Copenhagen. The six hostages were Hemming Gadh, Lars Siggesson (Sparre), Jöran Siggesson (Sparre), Olof Ryning, Bengt Nilsson (Färla) – and Gustav Eriksson.

Election as king 

The election of Gustav Eriksson as a regent made many Swedish nobles, who had so far stayed loyal to King Christian, switch sides. Some noblemen, still loyal to the king, chose to leave Sweden, while others were killed. As a result, the Swedish Privy Council lost old members who were replaced by supporters of Gustav Eriksson. Most fortified cities and castles were conquered by Gustav's rebels, but the strongholds with the best defenses, including Stockholm, were still under Danish control. In 1522, after negotiations between Gustav Eriksson's faction and Lübeck, the Hanseatic city joined the war against Denmark. The winter of 1523 saw their joint forces attack the Danish and Norwegian areas of Scania, Halland, Blekinge, and Bohuslän. During this winter, Christian II was overthrown and replaced by Frederick I. The new king openly claimed the Swedish throne and had hopes Lübeck would abandon the Swedish rebels. The German city, preferring an independent Sweden to a strong Kalmar Union dominated by Denmark, took advantage of the situation and put pressure on the rebels. The city wanted privileges on future trade as well as guarantees regarding the loans they had granted the rebels. The Privy Council and Gustav Eriksson knew the support from Lübeck was absolutely crucial. As a response, the council decided to appoint Gustav Eriksson king.

The ceremonial election of Gustav as king of Sweden took place when the leading men of Sweden met in Strängnäs in June 1523. When the councilors of Sweden had chosen Gustav as king, he met with the two visiting councilors of Lübeck. The German representatives supported the appointment without hesitation and declared it an act of God. Gustav stated he had to bow to what was described as the will of God. In a meeting with the Privy Council, Gustav Eriksson announced his decision to accept. In the following ceremony, led by the deacon of Strängnäs, Laurentius Andreae, Gustav swore the royal oath. The next day, bishops and priests joined Gustav in Roggeborgen where Andreae raised the holy sacrament above a kneeling Gustav Eriksson. Flanked by the councilors of Lübeck, Gustav Eriksson was brought to Strängnäs Cathedral where the king sat down in the choir with the Swedish privy councilors on one side, and the Lübeck representatives on the other. After the hymn "Te Deum",  Andreae proclaimed Gustav Eriksson king of Sweden. He was, however, still not crowned. In 1983, in remembrance of the election of Gustav as Swedish king on 6 June, that date was declared the National Day of Sweden.

Eric XIV of Sweden 
Eric XIV was born at Tre Kronor on 13 December 1533. Before the age of two, he lost his mother. In 1536, his father, Gustav Vasa, married Margaret Leijonhufvud (1516–51), a Swedish noblewoman. He was crowned as Eric XIV, but was not necessarily the 14th king of Sweden named Eric. He and his brother Charles IX (1604–11) adopted regnal numbers according to Johannes Magnus's partly fictitious history of Sweden. There had, however, been at least six earlier Swedish kings with the name of Eric, as well as pretenders about whom very little is known.

In domestic politics, Eric's ambitions were strongly opposed by the Swedish nobility, including his half-brother, the later John III of Sweden (1537–92). John was the Duke of Finland and was married to a Polish princess, which made him friendly with Poland. John pursued an expansionist policy in Livonia (now Estonia, Latvia, and Lithuania) which led to contention between the brothers. In 1563, John was seized and tried for high treason by Eric's order.

In the fall of 1568, the dukes and the nobles rebelled, and Eric was dethroned. He was then imprisoned by Duke John, who took power. Eric's most trusted counsellor, Jöran Persson (1530–68), took much of the blame for the actions directed against the nobility during Eric XIV's reign and was executed shortly after John III ascended to the throne.

John III of Sweden 

John further initiated peace talks with Denmark and Lübeck to end the Scandinavian Seven Years' War, but rejected the resulting Treaties of Roskilde (1568) where his envoys had accepted far-reaching Danish demands. After two more years of fighting, this war was concluded without many Swedish concessions in the Treaty of Stettin (1570). During the following years he defeated Russia in the Livonian War, and regained Narva by the Treaty of Plussa in 1583. His foreign policy was affected by his connection to Poland; his son Sigismund III Vasa was made king of Poland in 1587.

In January 1569, John was recognized as king by the same riksdag that forced Eric XIV off the throne. But this recognition was not without influence from John; Duke Karl received confirmation on his dukedom without the restrictions of his power that the Arboga articles imposed. The nobility's power and rights were extended and their responsibilities lessened.

John was still concerned about his position as king as long as Eric was alive. In 1571 he ordered Erik's guards to kill him if there was any suspicion of an escape attempt. It is possible this is how Eric died in 1577.

Polish–Lithuanian Commonwealth 

Sigismund III Vasa was born when his parents, John III and Catherine Jagiellon, were held prisoner by John's brother King Eric XIV, but John replaced Eric in 1568. Sweden had become Protestant, but young Sigismund was raised Catholic. His Polish connection came through his mother, daughter of Sigismund I the Old, and the Jagiellonian dynasty had ruled
Poland and then the Polish–Lithuanian Commonwealth since 1386. Sigismund was elected King of the Polish–Lithuanian Commonwealth on 19 August 1587.

From that time his official name and title became "Sigismund III, by the grace of God, king of Poland, grand duke of Lithuania, Ruthenia, Prussia, Masovia, Samogitia, Livonia and also hereditary king of the Swedes, Goths and Wends"; after his father died in 1592, he added "hereditary king of the Swedes, Goths, and Vandals".
 Royal titles in Latin: Sigismundus Tertius Dei gratia rex Poloniæ, magnus dux Lithuaniæ, Russiæ, Prussiæ, Masoviæ, Samogitiæ, Livoniæque, necnon Suecorum, Gothorum Vandalorumque hæreditarius rex.
 English translation: Sigismund III, by the grace of God, king of Poland, grand duke of Lithuania, Ruthenia, Prussia, Masovia, Samogitia, Livonia, and also hereditary king of the Swedes, Goths and Vandals.

Opposition to Sigismund 
However, as was often the case with the Polish electoral monarchy, the outcome was strongly contested by the "losers" and a faction of the Polish nobility backed Maximilian III, Archduke of Austria. Upon hearing of his election King Sigismund slipped through the clutches of the Protestants in Sweden and landed in Poland on 7 October. He immediately agreed to give up several royal privileges to the Sejm (parliament) of the Commonwealth in the hope of winning over some of his enemies and settling the disputed election. Lesser Prussian Treasurer Jan Dulski proclaimed him king on behalf of the Crown Marshal Andrzej Opaliński. On 27 December, he was crowned in Wawel Cathedral in Kraków. It seemed that the issue of who would be King of Poland had been settled when Maximilian III invaded at the head of his army to claim his crown. The hostilities did not last long as Hetman Jan Zamoyski at the head of a Polish army loyal to King Sigismund met and successfully defeated the Austrian troops at the Battle of Byczyna and took Maximilian III as prisoner of war. However, at the request of Pope Sixtus V, King Sigismund III released Maximilian who surrendered his claim to the Polish Commonwealth in 1589. King Sigismund also tried to maintain peace with his powerful neighbor by marrying Archduchess Anna of Austria in 1592. It was always his intention to be allied with Catholic Austria against the Protestant forces that were tearing Christendom apart.

Polish-Swedish union 
After the death of John III of Sweden, his son Sigismund succeeded to the throne of Sweden. Sigismund at that time was already the elected King of Poland (since 1587). Sigismund certainly valued the Swedish throne and upon learning about the death of his father, and the pretensions to the throne of his uncle, Duke Charles of Södermanland, he asked the Sejm (Polish parliament) for permission to leave the Commonwealth and go to Sweden, where he could secure the Swedish crown. The Sejm gave him permission, and on 3 August 1593, Sigismund, accompanied by his wife, Anna of Habsburg, and other followers, departed for Sweden.

The agreement of 19 February seemed to have calmed the situation; Sigismund was crowned in Uppsala Cathedral and became the king of Sweden. The Kingdom of Sweden was now in a personal union with Poland-Lithuania. In July, Sigismund left Sweden in the hands of the regency council and returned to Poland. Sweden was to be ruled jointly by the Privy Council of Sweden and Sigismund's uncle Duke Charles.

Sigismund, however, reneged on his earlier promises, opening Catholic schools, and giving Catholics prominent posts. Charles in turn did not give up on acquiring the Swedish throne and pursued his own political agenda. The new Riksdag he summoned at Arboga in 1597 – again despite the King's orders – saw few participants, and only one from the Privy Council. Even so, Duke Charles did not achieve support for his military action, but initiated it nonetheless. Parts of southern Sweden were successfully taken. Several of the Privy Council members fled to Poland to convince Sigismund to take counteractions. Sigismund sent a diplomatic mission, in an attempt to solve the conflict by negotiations. Charles at first looked ready to negotiate but in fact he was playing for time, trying to confirm his power at another Riksdag (in Arboga), recruiting peasants for his army, and isolating Sigismund's followers.

War against Sigismund 

In 1598, the Sejm gave Sigismund the go-ahead to wage a military campaign against his opponents in Sweden; however it refused to give him significant support. Sigismund's army was composed mostly of mercenaries (Germans and Hungarians), supported by a relatively small Polish force (although with some artillery).

Sigismund's campaign was poorly planned. He was unable to coordinate his troop movements with his supporters, particularly Fleming who was supposed to attack Charles from Finland. After initial successes (the taking of Kalmar and defeating Charles' troops at Stegeborg), Sigismund's forces were defeated on September 25, 1598, at the Battle of Stångebro, (also known as the battle of Linköping). Sigismund was captured and forced to hand over some of his followers such as the Chancellor of Sweden, Erik Larsson Sparre, (1550–1600). In May 1599, Charles' forces captured the last fortress held by Sigismund, Kalmar. On July 24, 1599, the Riksdag in Stockholm officially dethroned Sigismund. The new King of Sweden was Charles IX of Sweden, and the Polish–Swedish union was dissolved after barely seven years of existence. In March 1600, some of Sigismund's supporters were executed, including five senators in an event known as the Linköping Bloodbath.

Tsardom of Russia

Polish-Muscovite War (1605–1618) 
The Polish–Muscovite War or the Polish–Russian War (1605–1618), in Poland known as the Dimitriads, took place in the early 17th century as a sequence of military conflicts and eastward invasions carried out by the Polish–Lithuanian Commonwealth, or the private armies and mercenaries led by the magnates (the Commonwealth aristocracy), when the Russian Tsardom was torn by a series of civil wars, the time most commonly referred to in the Russian history as the "Time of Troubles", sparked by the Russian dynastic crisis and overall internal chaos. The sides and their goals changed several times during this conflict: the Polish–Lithuanian Commonwealth was not formally at war with Russia until 1609, and various Russian factions fought amongst themselves, allied with the Commonwealth and other countries or fighting against them. Sweden also participated in the conflict during the course of the Ingrian War (1610–1617), sometimes allying itself with Russia, and other times fighting against it. The aims of the various factions changed frequently as well as the scale of the parties' goals, which ranged from minor border adjustments to imposing the Polish Kings or the Polish-backed impostors' claims to the Russian throne and even the creation of a new state by forming a union between the Commonwealth and Russia.

Russian Homage in 1611 
The war can be divided into four stages. In the first stage, certain commonwealth szlachta (nobility), encouraged by some Russian boyars (Russian aristocracy), but without the official consent of the Polish king Sigismund III Vasa, attempted to exploit Russia's weakness and intervene in its civil war by supporting the impostors for the tsardom, False Dmitriy I and later False Dmitriy II, against the crowned tsars, Boris Godunov and Vasili Shuiski. The first wave of the Polish intervention began in 1605 and ended in 1606 with the death of False Dmitri I. The second wave started in 1607 and lasted until 1609, when Tsar Vasili made a military alliance with Sweden. In response to this alliance, the Polish king Sigismund III decided to intervene officially and to declare war upon Russia, aiming to weaken Sweden's ally and to gain territorial concessions.

Hetman of the Crown Stanisław Żółkiewski held a triumphal entry by the Kraków suburb of the Royal Palace, leading with him the prisoners: the Russian tsar Wasyl IV Szujski, his brothers: Dimitri Szujski with his wife - Grand Duchess Ekaterina Grigoryevna, daughter Grigory Malyuta Skuratov and Ivan Shuysky Mikhail Shein, and Filaret, the non-canonical Patriarch of Moscow and All Russia. After early Commonwealth victories (Battle of Klushino), which culminated in Polish forces entering Moscow in 1610, Sigismund's son, Prince Władysław of Poland, was briefly elected tsar.

Władysław IV Vasa – Tsar of Russia 

With the intensification of the Polish intervention in Muscovy, in 1609, the royal family moved to their residence in Vilnius, capital of the Grand Duchy of Lithuania. There he witnessed the fire of Vilnius, an event which even required the royal family to evacuate their residence in the Vilnius Castle. Later that year, Władysław, aged 15, was elected Tsar by Muscovy's aristocracy council of Seven boyars, who overthrew tsar Vasily Shuysky during the Polish-Muscovite War and Muscovy's Time of Troubles. His election was ruined by his father, Sigismund, who aimed to convert Muscovy's population from Orthodox religion to Catholicism. Sigismund refused to agree to the boyar's request to send prince Władysław to Moscow and his conversion to Orthodoxy. Instead, Sigismund proposed that he should reign as a regent in Muscovy instead.[9] This unrealistic proposal led to a resumption of hostilities. Briefly, beginning in 1610, Władysław struck Muscovite silver and gold coins (Kopek) in the Russian mints in Moscow and Novgorod with his titulary Tsar and Grand Prince Vladislav Zigimontovych of all Russia.

Władysław tried to regain the tsar's throne himself, organizing a campaign in 1616. Despite some military victories, he was unable to capture Moscow. The Commonwealth gained some disputed territories in the Truce of Deulino, but Władysław was never able to reign in Russia; the throne during this time was instead held by tsar Michael Romanov. He held on to the title, without any real power, until 1634. Likely, the failure of this campaign showed Władysław the limits of royal power in Poland, as major factors for the failure included significant autonomy of the military commanders, which did not see Władysław as their superior, and lack of funds for the army, as the Polish parliament (sejm) refused to subsidize the war.

Elective-Hereditary Monarchy in Poland-Lithuania

Silver Age 

The election sejm of 1632 eventually concluded in the election of Władysław; he had no serious other contenders. The decision on who would be the Commonwealth's next king was reached on 8 November, but as the pacta conventa were not yet ready, the official announcement was delayed until 13 November. In the pacta conventa, Władysław pledged himself to fund a military school and equipment; to find a way to fund a naval fleet; to maintain current alliances; not to raise armies, give offices or military ranks to foreigners, negotiate peace treaties or declare war without the Sejm's approval; not to take a wife without the Senate's approval; to convince his brothers to take an oath to the Commonwealth; and to transfer the profits from the Royal Mint to the Royal Treasury rather than to a private treasury. When the election result had been announced by the Crown Grand Marshal, Łukasz Opaliński, the nobility (szlachta), who had taken part in the election, began festivities in honor of the new king, which lasted three hours. Władysław was crowned in the Wawel Cathedral, in Kraków on 6 February in the following year.

Władysław IV owed nominal allegiance to the Imperial Habsburgs as a member of the Order of the Golden Fleece. His relationship with the Habsburgs was relatively strong; although he was not above carrying some negotiations with their enemies, like France, he refused Cardinal Richelieu's 1635 proposal of an alliance and a full-out war against them, despite potential lure of territorial gains in Silesia. He realized that such a move would cause much unrest in a heavily Catholic Commonwealth, that he likely lacked the authority and power to push such a change of policy through the Sejm, and that the resulting conflict would be very difficult.[42] From 1636 onward, for the next few years, Władysław strengthened his ties with the Habsburgs.

In the meantime, Władysław still tried to take a leading role in European politics, and negotiate a peaceful settlement to the Thirty Years' War, a settlement which he hoped would ease his way into regaining the Swedish crown. Following the armistice of Stuhmsdorf, Władysław came to increasingly realize that his prospects for regaining the Swedish throne were dim. In the years 1636–1638 he proposed several reforms to strengthen his and his dynasty's power in the Commonwealth. His first plan was an attempt to secure a hereditary province within the country, which would not be threatened by the possible power shift following a future royal election; this, however, did not gain sufficient support in the Sejm.

Władysław used the title of the King of Sweden although he had no control over Sweden and never set foot in that country.

John II Casimir Vasa 
John Casimir for most of his life remained in the shadow of his older half-brother, Władysław IV Vasa.  He had few friends among the Polish nobility.  Unfriendly, secretive, dividing his time between lavish partying and religious contemplation, and disliking politics, he did not have a strong power base nor influence at the Polish court, instead supporting unfavorable Habsburg policies.  He did, however, display talent as a military commander, showing his abilities in the Smolensk War against Muscovy (1633).

The Deluge 
In 1648 John Casimir was elected by the Polish Parliament to succeed his half-brother on the Polish throne. The reign of the last of the Vasas in the Polish–Lithuanian Commonwealth would be dominated by the Russo-Polish War (1654–67), followed by the war with Sweden ("The Deluge"), the scene for which had been set by the Commonwealth's two previous Vasa kings. Most of Poland was invaded by the Swedish army during the Deluge without much of a fight, due to the conspiratorial complicity of Polish and Lithuanian governors and nobility. In the course of a few years, the Commonwealth rose to force the Swedes out of Poland, ending the short-lived intrusions and campaigns, however, at a high cost. Most of the cities and towns in the Commonwealth were sacked, plundered and some were burnt to the ground, mostly by the retreating enemy units. Although the reign of John Casimir is remembered to be one of the most disastrous and perhaps most unsuccessful in the history of Poland and the Polish–Lithuanian Commonwealth, he is often referred to as the "warrior king" that fought bravely to save his nation and his people.

In 1660 John II Casimir was forced to renounce his claim to the Swedish throne and acknowledge Swedish sovereignty over Livonia and the city of Riga in modern-day Latvia. John Casimir had married his brother's widow, Marie Louise Gonzaga (Polish: Maria Ludwika), who was a major support to the King. Marie Louise suddenly died in 1667 and this may have caused the monarch's early political decline.

Abdication and death 
On 16 September 1668, grief-stricken after the death of his wife in the previous year, John II Casimir abdicated the throne of the Polish–Lithuanian Commonwealth, and returned to France, where he joined the Jesuits and became abbot of Abbey of Saint-Germain-des-Prés in Paris. Following his abdication Michał Korybut Wiśniowiecki (Michael I) was elected the new king and was crowned on September 29, 1669. Before his death John Casimir intended to return to Poland, however shortly before the journey in Autumn 1672 he fell dangerously ill to the news of the fall of Kamieniec Podolski, which was seized by the Ottomans. He then turned to Pope Clement X to ask for assistance for the Commonwealth in a defensive war against the Turks. The French, who were secretly in contact with him during his stay in the abbey, were astonished by such a great affection of the king to remember the loss of his kingdom, and so concerned about the loss of only one city. Nevertheless, distressed and seriously ill John II Casimir died shortly after the unexpected Turkish invasion of Poland on December 16, 1672, from apoplexy and was buried inside the Wawel Cathedral in Kraków. His heart was interred in the Abbey of Saint-Germain-des-Prés.

Continuation in Sweden

Charles IX of Sweden 

The Riksdag at Linköping, 24 February 1604 declared that Sigismund abdicated the Swedish throne, that duke Charles was recognized as the sovereign. He was declared king as Karl IX (anglicized as Charles IX). Charles's short reign was one of uninterrupted warfare. The hostility of Poland and the breakup of Russia involved him in overseas contests for the possession of Livonia and Ingria, the Polish–Swedish War (1600–1611) and the Ingrian War, while his pretensions to claim Lappland brought upon him a war with Denmark in the last year of his reign.

In all these struggles, he was more or less unsuccessful, owing partly to the fact that he and his forces had to oppose superior generals (e.g. Jan Karol Chodkiewicz and Christian IV of Denmark) and partly to sheer ill-luck. Compared with his foreign policy, the domestic policy of Charles IX was comparatively unimportant. It aimed at confirming and supplementing what had already been done during his regency. He did not officially become king until 22 March 1604. The first deed in which the title appears is dated 20 March 1604; but he was not crowned until 15 March 1607.

Gustav II Adolf Vasa 

Gustavus Adolphus was born in Stockholm as the oldest son of Duke Charles of the Vasa dynasty and his second wife, Christina of Holstein-Gottorp. At the time, the King of Sweden was Gustavus Adolphus' cousin Sigismund. The staunch Protestant Duke Charles forced the Catholic Sigismund to let go of the throne of Sweden in 1599, a part of the preliminary religious strife before the Thirty Years' War, and reigned as regent before taking the throne as Charles IX of Sweden in 1604. Crown Prince Gustav Adolph had Gagnef-Floda in Dalecarlia as a duchy from 1610. Upon his father's death in October 1611, a sixteen-year-old Gustavus inherited the throne (declared of age and able to reign himself at seventeen as of 16 December), as well as an ongoing succession of occasionally belligerent dynastic disputes with his Polish cousin. Sigismund III wanted to regain the throne of Sweden and tried to force Gustavus Adolphus to renounce the title.

In a round of this dynastic dispute, Gustavus invaded Livonia when he was 31, beginning the Polish-Swedish War (1625–1629). He intervened on behalf of the Lutherans in Germany, who opened the gates to their cities to him. His reign became famous from his actions a few years later when in June 1630 he landed in Germany, marking the Swedish Intervention in the Thirty Years' War. Gustavus intervened on the anti-Imperial side, which at the time was losing to the Holy Roman Empire and its Catholic allies; the Swedish forces would quickly reverse that situation.

Gustavus was married to Maria Eleonora of Brandenburg, the daughter of John Sigismund, Elector of Brandenburg, and chose the Prussian city of Elbing as the base for his operations in Germany. He died in the Battle of Lützen in 1632. His early death was a great loss to the Lutheran side. This resulted in large parts of Germany and other countries, which had been conquered for Lutheranism, to be reconquered for Catholicism (via the Counter-Reformation). His involvement in the Thirty Years' War gave rise to the saying that he was the incarnation of "the Lion of the North", or as it is put in German "der Löwe von Mitternacht".

Thirty Years' War 
Gustav II Adolf's success in making Sweden one of the great powers of Europe, and perhaps the most important power in the Thirty Years' War after France and Spain, was due not only to his military brilliance, but also to important institutional reforms in Sweden's government. The chief among these reforms was the institution of the first Parish registrations, so that the central government could more efficiently tax and conscript its populace.

Gustavus Adolphus was an extremely able military commander. His innovative tactical integration of infantry, cavalry, logistics and particularly his use of artillery, earned him the title of the "Father of Modern Warfare". Future commanders who studied and admired Gustav II Adolf include Napoleon I of France and Carl von Clausewitz. His advancements in military science made Sweden the dominant Baltic power for the next one hundred years (see Swedish Empire). He is also the only Swedish monarch to be styled "the Great". This decision was made by the Swedish Estates of the Realm, when they convened in 1633. Thus, by their decision he is officially, to this day, to be called Gustaf Adolf the Great (Gustavus Adolphus Magnus).

Gustavus Adolphus was the main figure responsible for the success of Swedish arms during the Thirty Years' War and led his nation to great prestige. As a general, Gustavus Adolphus is famous for employing mobile artillery on the battlefield, as well as very aggressive tactics, where attack was stressed over defense, and mobility and cavalry initiative were emphasized.

Christina, Queen of Sweden 
Christina was the only surviving legitimate child of King Gustav II Adolph and his wife Maria Eleonora of Brandenburg. At the age of six she succeeded her father on the throne upon his death at the Battle of Lützen, and began ruling when she reached the age of 18.

Christina is remembered as one of the most educated women of the 1600s. She was fond of paintings, books, manuscripts, and sculptures. With her interest in religion, philosophy, mathematics and alchemy, she attracted many scientists to Stockholm, wanting the city to become the "Athens of the North". She was intelligent, fickle and moody; she rejected the sexual role of a woman. She caused a scandal when she decided not to marry and in 1654 when she abdicated her throne. She changed her name to Kristina Augusta Wasa and converted to Roman Catholicism, adopting the name Christina Alexandra.

At the age of 28 the "Minerva of the North" moved to Rome. The Pope described Christina as "a queen without a realm, a Christian without faith, and a woman without shame". Notwithstanding all that, she became a leader of the theatrical and musical life and protected many Baroque artists, composers, and musicians.

Swedish noblemen 
Johan Kristiernsson Vasa of Örby in the province of Uppland
Erik Johansson Vasa (1470–1520), Privy Councillor, lord of Rydboholm Castle in the Roslagen

Regents of Sweden 
 Kettil Karlsson (c. 1433–1465), Bishop of Linköping, reigned as Lord Protector and Regent of Sweden 1464–1465

Monarchs of Sweden 
Gustav I (born 1496, reigned 1523–1560)
Eric XIV (reigned 1560–1568)
John III (reigned 1568–1592)
Sigismund (reigned 1592–1599)
Charles IX (reigned 1599–1611; officially became king in March 1604)
Gustavus Adolphus (Gustav Adolf the Great) (reigned 1611–1632)
Christina (reigned 1632–1654)

In 1654 Christina, the daughter of Gustavus Adolphus, the Protestant Champion of the Thirty Years' War, abdicated, converted to Roman Catholicism and left the country. The throne passed to her half-cousin Charles X of the House of Palatinate-Zweibrücken, a cadet branch of the Wittelsbachs.

The kings of the house of Holstein-Gottorp, which produced the kings of Sweden from 1751 to 1818, emphasized their Vasa descent through a female line. The current ruling house of Bernadotte similarly claims a Vasa mantle: Charles XIV was an adopted son of Charles XIII; his son Oscar I married a Vasa descendant Josephine of Leuchtenberg; their grandson Gustav V married Victoria of Baden who was a great-grandchild of Gustav IV Adolf of the house Holstein-Gottorp.

Monarchs of Poland and Lithuania 
Sigismund III Vasa (1587–1632)
Władysław IV (1632–1648)
John II Casimir (1648–1668)

John III of Sweden married Catherine Jagellonka, the sister of Sigismund II Augustus of Poland. When Sigismund II of Poland died without issue, the son of John III of Sweden and Catherine Jagellonka was elected King of Poland and Grand Duke of Lithuania as Sigismund III in 1587. On John's death, Sigismund also gained the Swedish throne.

However, Sigismund was Catholic, which ultimately led to his losing the throne in Sweden. His Lutheran uncle Charles IX succeeded him. We thus have two Houses of Vasa from this point onwards: the senior, Catholic branch ruling in Poland and Lithuania, and the cadet, Protestant branch ruling in Sweden. This arrangement led to numerous wars between the two states. After John, the Polish Vasa died out. See also Rulers of Poland.

Family tree

See also 
Vasa (disambiguation), listing many things named Vasa
Swedish monarchs family tree
Arms of the kings of Sweden (fr)
Warship Vasa
Vaasa, Finland
House of Vasaborg
Vasa Order of America
List of Swedish wars

References

External links